"Independent Love Song" is a song by British musical duo Scarlet, taken from their debut album, Naked (1994). The power ballad was a hit single, entering the UK Singles Chart at number 26 and reaching a peak of number 12 in February 1995. The single became a top-ten hit on the Irish Singles Chart, where it peaked at number 10, and charted within the top 50 in Germany, Iceland, Sweden, and Switzerland. Other tracks on the release included "The Fall" and "Independent Love Song" (3am Mix).

Critical reception
Larry Flick from Billboard wrote, "There is not much innovation, just a booming power ballad with simple lyrics, dramatic instrumentation, and a female lead vocal that soars to glass-shattering soprano heights. It certainly works, pressing every reactionary listener button. Translation: This single should become an immediate AC radio staple." In his weekly UK chart commentary, James Masterton said, "My own very personal view is that it is easily one of the singles of the year, a startlingly beautiful power-pop ballad, one of those rare records that has the capacity to move you to tears when played at high volume. Alright so I'm biased in this particular commentary but if there is any record which should, nay deserves to be a massive hit it is this one." Pan-European magazine Music & Media said, "The ghost of Shakespears Sister will stay with you through Scarlet, another female pop duo with a harmless tic. Winter time has proven to be the right moment for such orchestrated pop." A reviewer from Music Week described it as "slow-burning balladry from female duo signed by WEA A&R consultant Gary Crowley."

Music video
The accompanying music video for "Independent Love Song" was shot in Times Square, New York. The black-and-white video shows Cheryl Parker (vocals) sitting on a piano with Jo Youle (pianist) performing the song, while children dressed as Cupid shoot passers-by to make them fall in love.

Track listings
 UK 7-inch and cassette single
 "Independent Love Song" – 3:51
 "Independent Love Song" (original 7-inch version) – 3:47

 UK, European and Australian CD single
 "Independent Love Song" – 3:51
 "The Fall" – 4:15
 "Independent Love Song" (3AM mix) – 3:48

Charts

Weekly charts

Year-end charts

References

1994 songs
1995 singles
1990s ballads
Black-and-white music videos
British power pop songs
Pop ballads
Warner Music Group singles